Emo is a small rural township, located along the Rainy River near the southwestern corner of northern Ontario, Canada, on the U.S. border directly north of the state of Minnesota. Emo had a population of 1,333 in the Canada 2016 Census.

It is known for its stock car races, its picturesque, family-friendly waterfront park, the annual Rainy River Agricultural Fair (cattle industry is key in the area) and the Emo Walleye Classic fishing tournament.

History
Emo was officially created on July 1, 1899, and celebrated its centennial in 1999. Emo's first reeve was Alexander Luttrell, an Irishman who named the town after a namesake village in Ireland near where he was born. The council was composed of Charles Fisher, John Dungey, Benjamin Phillips, and Thomas Shortreed.

The post office, Emo River, dates from 1887.

Climate
Emo has a four-season humid continental climate with extreme temperature differences between summer and winter. The daily mean difference between January and July is as much as 34 °C.

Local government

Emo is located in the Rainy River District. The current serving (acclaimed) mayor is Harold McQuaker, while Lisa Teeple, Harrold Boven, Phil Whatley, and Gerald Weiringa serve as councillors. Elections are held every four years, in October.
Emo has been a source of controversy in the past, as it refused in 2020 to declare Pride Week or fly a pride flag. Mayor McQuaker, councillor Boven and former councillor Warren Toles voted against the motion to declare Pride Week, while former councillors Lincoln Dunn and Loriann Shortreed voted in favour. Subsequently, a complaint was filed against the Township and the three councillors with the Ontario Human Rights Tribunal, which is ongoing, and has cost Emo taxpayers an estimated $100,000 in legal fees, including the legal fees of the three council members named in the complaint.

Amenities
Emo is about halfway between two bridges to the United States, one at Fort Frances (approximately a 30-minute drive) and the other at Rainy River (about 40 minutes by road). It is identified in many cycling resources as an excellent overnight stopping point because of the facilities (shelter, showers and bathrooms) available in the waterfront park.

There are many volunteer groups and a strong sense of community in Emo. In Emo's Lion's Park, a picturesque riverfront area, a new play structure was funded through volunteer fundraising efforts, and a 2005-2006 fiscal year grant from the Ontario Trillium Foundation . The park is also home to the Emo Spray Park, a $500,000 community-driven project completed in July 2010. A safe way for kids to engage in water play, the spray park attracts thousands of visitors in the summertime.

The spring brings the opening of the walleye fishing season, and the annual Emo Walleye Classic.

The Emo Speedway draws race participants and fans from the central United States, Northwestern Ontario and Manitoba. The track is a 600-metre, high-banked dirt oval track which operates every Saturday from May through Mid-September.

Emo is also home to four different religious denominations, including Knox United Church of Canada, as well as Baptist, Catholic, and Christian Reformed churches.

The Emo Food Bank and Thrift Shop, located in what was formerly the Anglican Church, helps hundreds of area residents in need every year.

Initially located in private homes of local women, the town library was moved to the schoolhouse in 1940 and to its own building in the 50s.

Demographics

Emo Walleye Classic
The Emo Walleye Classic is a two-day catch and release fishing tournament held annually in Emo, during the final week of May each year. It takes place on the Rainy River, which marks the border between Minnesota and Ontario.

Upwards of sixty Canadian and American teams of two participate each year, each paying a participation fee ($500 in 2015). An organizing committee and many local volunteers assist at the event, and many local businesses and individuals sponsor the event.

On each morning of the tournament, anglers head upstream and downstream from the Emo waterfront to their chosen fishing spots. The weigh-ins are held in the evenings at the Emo/LaVallee Community Centre where results are posted live. On the final day of the tournament, the top ten teams from day one are brought into the arena with their boats.

Classic history
The tournament began in 2002 with forty-four participating teams, and has grown since then, with thirty-eight teams competing in 2013. The first winners were Harvey Cochrane and Oliver Gibbons who won as a result of the leading team having three fish over the legal size. In 2008 Doug McBride of Devlin, Ontario and Steve Ballan of Fort Frances, Ontario became the first team to win the tournament twice.

Past winners
 2020: Tournament cancelled due to COVID-19
 2019: Dan Pollard and Josh Pollard; Weight: 15.69 lbs
 2018: Les Morrison and Oliver Gibbons; Weight: 19.53 lbs
 2017: Les Morrison and Oliver Gibbons; Weight: 22.03 lbs
 2016: Ted Heyens and Kelvin Caul; Weight: 23.94 lbs
 2015: Bill Godin and Ralph Galusha; Weight: 13.70 lbs
 2014: Bill Godin and Ralph Galusha; Weight: 17.84 lbs
 2013: Les Morrison and Oliver Gibbons; Weight: 20.16 lbs
 2012: Paul Allan and Hason Rostek; Weight: 17.13 lbs
 2011: Rod Woodgate	and Dylan Swire; Weight: 19.67 lbs
 2010: Bill Godin and Ralph Galusha; Weight: 11.32 lbs
 2009: Ted Heyens and Kelvin Caul; Weight: 24.98 lbs
 2008: Doug McBride and Steve Ballan; Weight: 24.89 lbs
 2007: Bill Godin and Ralph Galusha; Weight: 19.47 lbs
 2006: Todd Grennier and Eric Lessman; Weight: 16.12 lbs
 2005: Doug McBride and Steve Ballan; Weight: 25.82 lbs
 2004: Dale Hartlin and Dan Pollard; Weight: 20.28 lbs
 2003: Todd Baker and Greg Stahn; Weight: 19.22 lbs
 2002: Harvey Cochrane and Oliver Gibbons; Weight: 15.00 lbs

Records
 Biggest fish 
2005 Tournament - Day 2 - Doug McBride and Steve Ballan: 10.02 lbs

 Biggest catch 
2005 Tournament - Day 2 - Doug McBride and Steve Ballan: 15.06 lbs

 Highest tournament two-day total 
2005 Tournament - Doug McBride and Steve Ballan: 25.82 lbs

See also
List of townships in Ontario

References

External links

Municipalities in Rainy River District
Single-tier municipalities in Ontario
Township municipalities in Ontario